This was the first edition of the event.

Ross Case and Geoff Masters won the title, defeating Pat Du Pré and Tom Gorman 6–3, 6–4 in the final.

Seeds

  Sherwood Stewart /  Dick Stockton (quarterfinals)
  John Alexander /  Syd Ball (first round)
  Mark Edmondson /  John Marks (quarterfinals)
  Arthur Ashe /  Ilie Năstase (semifinals)

Draw

Draw

External links
 Draw

Tokyo Indoor
1978 Grand Prix (tennis)